The Pichori Church is located in the village of Pichori, Gali Municipality, Autonomous Republic of Abkhazia, Georgia.

History 
The church is built in the Middle Ages. 
Currently the area is occupied by Russia, which is why it is impossible to study the church and perform appropriate works.

References 

Churches in Abkhazia
Cultural heritage of Georgia (country)